Felicia of Sicily (c. 1078—c. 1102) is a name used for one Queen consort of Hungary and Croatia.

She was daughter of Count Roger I of Sicily and his second wife, Eremburga of Mortain. She is also called Busilla, but this name is a misunderstanding of the ancient Italian word pucelle meaning "virgin".

Coloman, King of Hungary sent his envoys to her father's court to propose marriage to her in 1096, but the Count of Sicily did not qualify the envoys illustrious enough and refused the offer. The second mission of the King of Hungary was led by Bishop Hartvik, but insisted on further negotiations. Finally, the envoys, led by Prince Álmos, 
accompanied Felicia to Hungary, where she was married to Coloman around 1097.

She was followed by some Sicilian courtiers as well, e.g. the ancestors of the future gens Rátót (Olivér and Rátót) who arrived to Hungary in her escort.

Marriage and children
# c. 1097: King Coloman of Hungary (c. 1070 –  3 February 1116)
 Sophia (before 1101 – ?), wife of a Hungarian noble
 King Stephen II of Hungary (1101 – 1 March 1131)
 Ladislaus (?)

Notes and references

Sources
 Soltész, István: Árpád-házi királynék (Gabo, 1999)
 Kristó, Gyula - Makk, Ferenc: Az Árpád-ház uralkodói (IPC Könyvek, 1996)

|-

Hungarian queens consort
Italo-Normans
Sicilian people of Norman descent
Burials at the Basilica of the Assumption of the Blessed Virgin Mary
Burials at St. Michael's Cathedral, Alba Iulia
11th-century Hungarian women
12th-century Hungarian people
12th-century Hungarian women
11th-century Italian nobility
11th-century Italian women
1070s births
1100s deaths